Miller Children's and Women's Hospital Long Beach is a non-profit children's hospital located on the campus of Long Beach Memorial Medical Center in Long Beach, California. Miller Children's and Women's provides specialized pediatric care for infants, children, teens, and young adults aged 0–21. The hospital also houses MemorialCare's women's services, providing maternity care to women across Southern California. The hospital has 357 beds.

About 
Miller Children's and Women's is one of only eight free-standing children's hospitals in California — treating more than 14,000 children each year — and has become a regional pediatric destination for more than 84,000 children, who need specialized care in the outpatient specialty and satellite centers.

In 2007, the hospital was named to Leapfrog's top hospital list for the second year in a row.

The hospital first received Magnet designation by the American Nurses Credentialing Center (ANCC) in 2013 and again in 2018.

References

External links
 Official web site
This hospital in the CA Healthcare Atlas A project by OSHPD
 Careers

See also 

 Long Beach Memorial Medical Center

Hospitals in Los Angeles County, California
Buildings and structures in Long Beach, California
Children's hospitals in the United States
Women's hospitals
Pediatric trauma centers
Women in California